Crooks is a surname. Notable people with the surname include:

 Adam Crooks (activist) (1824–1874), Weslyan Methodist
 Adam Crooks (politician) (1827–1885), Canadian politician
 Ann Marie Crooks, female bodybuilder and professional wrestler
 Bill Crooks, New Zealand horticulturalist
 Charmaine Crooks (born 1962), Canadian athlete
 Colin Crooks, British diplomat 
 Dave Crooks (born 1963), American politician
 David Crooks (RNZAF officer) (born 1931),  New Zealand air marshal
 Garth Crooks (born 1958), English former footballer
 Gavin E. Crooks, English chemist
 Hulda Crooks (1896–1997), American mountaineer
 Jack Crooks (1865–1918), American baseball player
 James Crooks (1778–1860), Scottish businessman
 Kate Crooks (1833–1871), Canadian botanist
 Lee Crooks (born 1978), English former footballer
 Tupac Shakur (born Lesane Parish Crooks, 1971-1996), American rapper
 Mary Crooks (born 1950), Australian public policy specialist
 N. Patrick Crooks (1938-2015), American Supreme Court judge
 Paul Crooks, former Formula One engineer
 Ramsay Crooks (1787–1859), Canadian fur trader
 Richard Crooks (1900–1972), American tenor
 Sammy Crooks (1908–1981), English footballer
 Thomas Crooks (born 1862), American football coach
 Tim Crooks (born 1949), British former rower
 Will Crooks (1852–1921), British trade unionist
 William Crooks (Canadian politician) (1776–1836), Canadian politician

See also
Crook (surname)